Cornelius R. Roberts (born February 29, 1936) is a former American football player who played fullback for the USC Trojans, the Toronto Argonauts and the San Francisco 49ers.

High school career
Roberts graduated from Oceanside High School in Northern San Diego County.

College career
At the University of Southern California, Roberts led the Trojans to a 44–20 victory over Texas during the 1956 season. It was the first time a black player competed against a white player in that state. He rushed for 251 yards ononly 12 carries and was cheered as he left the field. Prior to the event, the University of Texas did not want him to attend the game, but the USC players refused to play without him. He was shouted down and called the "N" word by some fans.  

He got a degree in business administration from what is now the Marshall School of Business.

Professional career
After being drafted in the fourteenth round of the 1958 NFL draft by the New York Giants, Roberts opted instead to sign with the Toronto Argonauts of the "Big Four" (soon to be renamed the Eastern Conference) of the Canadian Football League, whose head coach was fellow Californian Hamp Pool. Forming what the Canadian Press called "the best all-round backfield in the Big Four" along with Dick Shatto and fellow rookie Dave Mann, Roberts rushed for 595 yards and five touchdowns, including touchdown runs of 67 and 85 yards. After 10 games in double blue, however, he became a casualty of the 12-man import quota limiting the number of US players who could suit up for the Argos, and was released by Pool in favour of the more versatile Jim Rountree, a defensive standout. After making headlines north of the border, Roberts tried out in 1959 for the Pittsburgh Steelers, but failed to make the team. After being cut, he was picked up by the San Francisco 49ers and played for the team between 1959 and 1962.

References

External links
 

1936 births
Living people
American football fullbacks
San Francisco 49ers players
USC Trojans football players
Sportspeople from San Diego County, California
Players of American football from Los Angeles
Players of Canadian football from Los Angeles